is a Japanese politician of the Democratic Party of Japan, a member of the House of Representatives in the Diet (national legislature). A native of Yanagawa, Fukuoka and graduate of the University of Tokyo, he was a bureaucrat at the Ministry of Construction from 1971 to 1988. He was elected to the House of Representatives for the first time in 1990.

References

External links 
 Official website in Japanese.

Members of the House of Representatives (Japan)
University of Tokyo alumni
People from Yanagawa, Fukuoka
Politicians from Fukuoka Prefecture
Living people
1947 births
Democratic Party of Japan politicians
21st-century Japanese politicians